The Ultimate Collection is a 1997 compilation album by Santana. It is unique in that it includes material from his early Columbia days up to the 1992 Milagro release on Polydor. No other compilation album includes material from Milagro.

Track listing

Disc 1
"Jingo"
"Evil Ways"
"Soul Sacrifice"
"Black Magic Woman"
"Oye Como Va"
"Samba Pa Ti"
"Everybody's Everything"
"No One to Depend On"
"Song of the Wind"
"Love, Devotion and Surrender"
"Give and Take"
"Europa (Earth's Cry Heaven's Smile)"
"Dance Sister Dance (Baila Mi Hermana)"
"Let the Children Play"
"Revelations"
"She's Not There"
"I'll Be Waiting"
"Stormy"
"One Chain (Don't Make No Prison)"

Disc 2
"Well...All Right"
"Open Invitation"
"Aqua Marine"
"All I Ever Wanted"
"You Know That I Love You"
"Winning"
"Sensitive Kind"
"Hold On"
"Nowhere to Run"
"What Does It Take (To Win Your Love)"
"Say It Again"
"How Long"
"I'm the One Who Loves You"
"Veracruz"
"Gypsy Woman"
"Right On"
"Havana Moon"
"Daughter of the Night"
"They All Went to Mexico"

Disc 3
"Jingo" (Live)
"Soul Sacrifice" (Live at the Woodstock Festival, Bethel, New York, Saturday, August 16, 1969)
"Them Changes" (Live)
"Samba Pa Ti" (Live)
"Black Magic Woman/Gypsy Queen" (Live)
"She's Not There" (Live)
"Esperando" (Live)

Charts

Weekly charts

Year-end charts

Sales and certifications

References

1997 compilation albums
Santana (band) compilation albums